Dodowa Forest is a tourist site attraction at Dodowa in the Shai Osudoku District in the Greater Accra Region of Ghana.

The Tsenku Waterfalls also called also called Wuruduwurudu Falls is located in the Dodowa Forest.The Dodowa forest is the battle-field of the Kantamanso war which ended in 1826.

There is a giant Boabab tree at the edge of Dodowa where the ceremony was held to mark the end of conflict.

References

Protected areas of Ghana